Battleaxe is a fantasy novel by Australian author Sara Douglass, the first book in the Axis Trilogy. This first book revolves around Axis, Battleaxe of the Axe-Wielders, and Faraday, daughter of Earl Isend of Skarabost. Their lives are forever changed by a prophecy, and by meeting each other.

Plot introduction
The first characters introduced are two unnamed women in mortal peril, one who is pregnant and one who has just given birth. The pregnant one is trying desperately to reach shelter during a snowstorm. She is an outcast of her people, the Avar, because she has decided to carry her child, conceived during a festival and considered an abomination, to term. A group of demonic creatures, skraelings, watch as her unborn child brutally eats his way out of her womb, killing her. The monsters are delighted and decide to adopt the hateful child.

The second woman had given birth to an illegitimate child two days before, who she believes is dead. The child was illegitimate, and she is of high-born, perhaps noble, birth. After giving birth, she is taken and dumped in the freezing cold mountains to die.

Plot summary

The land of Achar has prospered for centuries under the care of the one god, Artor the Ploughman. Now, however, disturbing rumors have reached the ears of Jayme, Brother-Leader of the Seneschal, head of the worship of Artor. Evidence suggests that the Forbidden, who were driven out of Achar long ago, have returned. Jayme is relieved to find that Axis, the leader of the Axe-Wielders, an elite force under the command of the Seneschal, has returned from his latest assignment. Others are not as welcoming, because Axis is the illegitimate son of the Princess Rivkah, sister of King Priam. Rivkah is thought to have died while giving birth to Axis, and he has been a thorn in the King's side ever since.

Meanwhile, Faraday, the beautiful daughter of Earl Isend, is also at court for the King's nameday celebration. The Earl manages to get a betrothal for her to Borneheld, Rivkah's legitimate son and Priam's likely heir. Faraday is far more interested in Borneheld's half-brother, Axis.

Axis embarks on an assignment to support the towns that may be facing the Forbidden. Faraday rides with him, but she is separated from Axis along the journey.

Faraday and her companions now travel to Gorkenfort, where her betrothed lives. She is unsettled by ideas and people she encounters, both along the way and by her husband's side. Though in love with Axis, she is told that it is vital to the future that she marry Borneheld. Even more confusing, she seems to have some kind of relationship with the forest, which all Artor-fearing Acharites hate.

As Axis continues his journey, he begins to encounter strange things that call into question everything he has devoutly believed all his life. In Smyrton, he meets two of the Forbidden who have been cruelly treated by the villagers. Touched by pity, he sings to the little girl, who is near death, and mysteriously saves her life. Even more disturbing than this, he is told that his fate is intertwined with a prophecy about a world in which the human and the Forbidden live side by side, and that he may be the one to defeat Gorgrael, who is mounting a campaign to take over Achar.

Reception
Kirkus Reviews wrote that while the "ingredients are familiar", Douglass "handles matters impressively" and the characters are "fully drawn". Publishers Weekly wrote that the novel is "strongest at the beginning", and that it "soon loses dramatic tension". Jackie Cassada of Library Journal wrote that "epic storytelling" makes the novel a "solid selection for most fantasy collections."

References

1995 Australian novels
1995 fantasy novels
Novels by Sara Douglass
Voyager Books books